Year 493 (CDXCIII) was a common year starting on Friday (link will display the full calendar) of the Julian calendar. At the time, it was known as the Year of the Consulship of Albinus and Eusebius (or, less frequently, year 1246 Ab urbe condita). The denomination 493 for this year has been used since the early medieval period, when the Anno Domini calendar era became the prevalent method in Europe for naming years.

Events 
 By place 

 Byzantine Empire 
 Isaurian War: Claudiopolis, ancient city of Cappadocia, is besieged and captured by the Romans. The Isaurians blockade the mountain passes, but John the Hunchback (John Gibbo) wins an overwhelming victory against the rebels.

 Ireland 
 March – Battle for the Body of St. Patrick: The Uí Néill Dynasty fights over the body of Saint Patrick with the Airgialla Kingdom (according to the Annals of the Four Masters).

 Europe 
 February 25 – Odoacer surrenders Ravenna after a 3-year siege, and agrees to a mediated peace with Theodoric the Great, who steadily consolidates his rule and provides security for the local population. His achievement is to manage the transformation of Italy from being the center of a fractured Roman Empire to a successful and independent Ostrogothic Kingdom. 
 Onoulphus, brother of Odoacer, is killed during the siege of Ravenna by archers while seeking refuge in a church. 
 March 15 – Odoacer is invited to a banquet organised in order to celebrate the peace treaty. During the festivities, Odoacer is killed by Theodoric the Great. His body is skillfully sliced in half in full view of his guests. A massacre of Odoacer's soldiers and supporters follows.
 Theodoric the Great allies with the Franks and marries Audofleda, sister of Clovis I. He also marries his own female relatives to princes or kings of the Burgundians, Vandals and Visigoths, establishing a political alliance with the Germanic kingdoms in the West.
 Clovis I marries the Burgundian princess Clotilde, age 18; she is brought up in the Catholic faith and is the daughter of King Chilperic II. Her father is murdered in the same year by his brother Gundobad.

 China 
 Emperor Xiao Wen Di starts adopting a sinicization policy as well as various reforms. He marries Feng Qing, she becomes empress of the Northern Wei Dynasty.  

 By topic 

 Religion 
 Mor Hananyo Monastery is established by Mor Shlemon, converting a former Roman fortress (ex temple) in the Tur Abdin region on the Turkish/Syrian border.

Births 
 Cerbonius, bishop of Populonia (approximate date)
 Erzhu Rong, general of Northern Wei (d. 530)

Deaths 
 March 15 – Odoacer, first "barbarian" king of Italy (b. 433)
 March 17 (approximate date) – Saint Patrick, Romano-British Christian missionary, patron saint of Ireland
 Chilperic II, king of Burgundy
 Daniel the Stylite, Christian saint
 Onoulphus, general and brother of Odoacer
 Emperor Wu of Southern Qi (b. 440)
 Xiao Zhangmao, crown prince of Southern Qi (b. 458)

References